Rabun County is the north-easternmost county in the U.S. state of Georgia. As of the 2020 census, the population was 16,883, up from 16,276 in 2010. The county seat is Clayton. The year 2018 was the wettest on record in the county's history. The National Weather Service cooperative observation station in northwest Rabun's Germany Valley measured 116.48 inches of rain during the year. During 2020, the Germany Valley NWS station reported a yearly precipitation total of 100.19 inches.

History
As early as 1760, explorers came to the area now known as Rabun County. In the 18th century, the population of Cherokee in the area was so heavy that this portion of the Appalachian Mountains was sometimes called the "Cherokee Mountains."  The early explorers and settlers divided the Cherokee people into three divisions depending on location and dialect, the Lower, Middle, and Over-the-Hill. There were at least four Cherokee settlements in what would later become Rabun County. A Middle settlement called Stikayi (Stiyaki, Sticoa, Stekoa) was located on Stekoa Creek, probably southeast of the present-day Clayton. An Over-the-Hill settlement called Tallulah was located on the upper portion of the Tallulah River. There were also two Cherokee settlements of unknown division, Chicherohe (Chechero), which was destroyed during the American Revolutionary War, located along Warwoman Creek, east of Clayton, and Eastertoy (Eastatowth, Estatowee) which was located near the present-day Dillard.

Despite the prominence of the Cherokee, there is evidence that other Native Americans were in the region before them. A mound similar to others across North Georgia (including the famous Etowah Indian Mounds) is located about one mile (1.6 km) east of Dillard, Georgia and is likely a remnant of an earlier mound-building Native American culture known as the Mississippian culture. The mound location is listed on the National Register of Historic Places as the Hoojah Branch Site.

Explorer and naturalist William Bartram was one of the early visitors to Rabun County. According to his journal entries for May, 1775, Bartram crossed the Chattooga River into Georgia near its confluence with Warwoman Creek. He later went through a junction of Cherokee trails called Dividings (which would later become Clayton), and then traveled north to an area called Passover (which would later become Mountain City). During his visit to the area, he also climbed Rabun Bald. His travels in Rabun County are memorialized today by the Georgia portion of the hiking trail known as the Bartram Trail.

John Dillard and his family were among the first documented settlers in the area in 1794 as a result of a land grant for his service in the American Revolution. The settlers were initially tolerated, but tensions increased as displaced Cherokees moved in from other areas. Eventually, the white settlers were viewed as invaders who did not respect nature and killed the game and, as a result, raids between the clashing cultures became commonplace. For the most part, the hostilities ended a few years before the Cherokee ceded the land to Georgia in 1817.

The Georgia General Assembly passed an act to create the county on December 21, 1819, becoming Georgia's forty-seventh county. The northern border of the county was established as latitude 35°N, which is the boundary between Georgia and North Carolina. Due to irregularities in an early survey mission, the Georgia-North Carolina border at Rabun County's northeast corner was erroneously set several hundred yards north of the 35th parallel, giving this location at Ellicott's Rock the distinction of being the State of Georgia's northernmost point. The county is named for William Rabun, who served as the 11th Governor of Georgia from his election in 1817 until his death in 1819. In 1828, the Georgia General Assembly transferred a portion of Habersham County to Rabun County. In 1838, the legislature redefined the Rabun-Habersham county line. In 1856, the legislature used portions of Rabun and Union Counties to create Towns County.

During the U.S. Civil War, Rabun County was one of only five Georgia counties that did not declare secession from the Union. Although the county was largely untouched by the Civil War, the area did border on anarchy during that time. The county was described by some as being "almost a unit against secession." One of the county's residents recalled in 1865 that "You cannot find a people who were more averse to secession than were the people of our county." He stated that "I canvassed the county in 1860–61 myself and I know that there were not exceeding twenty men in this county who were in favor of secession." Despite its overall loyalty to the Union, Rabun County did field two regiments for the Confederate cause: Rabun 24th Regiment, Georgia Infantry, Company E, Rabun Gap Riflemen; and Rabun 52nd Regiment, Georgia Infantry, Company F, Beauregard Braves.

In 1898, the Tallulah Falls Railway was constructed on a north–south track through the county. One of the most popular stops along the railway was Tallulah Gorge. The Railway was in operation for more than 60 years and was featured in the Disney movie, The Great Locomotive Chase.

Starting in the 1920s, many of the improvements in the county can be attributed to the establishment, growth and expansion of the Chattahoochee National Forest in the county. One of the key figures in the establishment and growth of the Chattahoochee National Forest was "Ranger Nick" Nicholson, Georgia's first forest ranger. Among other things, Ranger Nick was responsible for arranging for telephone lines to be run from Clayton, Georgia to the Pine Mountain community in the eastern part of the county.

Deliverance (1972), a highly popular film about a group of city men taking a canoe trip in north Georgia, was filmed largely in Rabun County. After the film's release, Rabun County experienced an increase in tourism, with the number of visitors going from hundred to tens of thousands. By 2012, 40 years later, tourism was the largest source of revenue in the county. According to the US Census, the population has doubled since 1970.

Claude Terry, Jon Voight's stunt double for this film, later purchased river equipment used in the movie from Warner Brothers. He founded Southeastern Expeditions, what is now the oldest whitewater rafting adventure company on the Chattooga River. By 2012 rafting had developed as a $20 million industry in the region.

Because of the scenery, people with money have built vacation and second homes around the area's lakes. In June 2012, Rabun County held a Chattooga River Festival to encourage preservation of the river and its environment. It also noted the 40th anniversary of the filming of Deliverance in the area, an aspect which aroused controversy in planning for the festival.

Law & Government

The county is governed by a five-member Board of Commissioners.  In addition to the Rabun County Sheriff's Office, the towns of Clayton, Mountain City, Dillard, Sky Valley, and Tallulah Falls all have their own police departments.

Rabun County is protected by a volunteer fire department, which is made up of 12 stations, 14 engines, 11 tankers, three boats, and 250 volunteers. Two of the stations (Scaly Mountain/Sky Valley and Tallulah Falls) are separate organizations from Rabun County Fire Services. The county also has an EMA station which is completely volunteer, which provides emergency technical rescue services which include wilderness and urban search and rescue, technical rope rescue, swift-water rescue, confined space rescue, and dive rescue.

Politics

Geography

Approximately, 60% of the land is in National Forest and State Parks, approximately 20% is held by Georgia Power and the rest is in private hands. With  of the Chattahoochee National Forest, a national protected area, located within its boundaries, Rabun County hosts the largest portion of the Chattahoochee National Forest of any of the 18 counties with land included in the Forest. Most of Rabun County is located in the Tugaloo River sub-basin in the larger Savannah River basin, with a northern portion of the county located in the Upper Little Tennessee sub-basin in the Upper Tennessee River basin.

Features
The county's three major lakes were created in the early 20th century by Georgia Power for hydroelectric power generation. The county also boasts a large number of trout streams, including the Tallulah River and its tributaries, Coleman River and Charlies Creek.

The Eastern Continental Divide runs through the county, roughly from southwest to northeast, also representing a portion of the Tennessee Valley Divide. The county's eastern border with South Carolina is formed by the Chattooga River, the largest tributary of the Tugaloo River and then Savannah River (which forms the rest of the border of the two states). The north-central portion of Rabun County is in the watershed of the Little Tennessee River, which flows northward from Mountain City. The high elevation along the divide gives Rabun County the most snow of any in county in Georgia. This also gives it mild weather throughout the warmer months of the year, leading to the county's slogan, Where Spring Spends the Summer. Rabun County is the only county in Georgia with three state parks: Black Rock Mountain, Moccasin Creek, and Tallulah Gorge.

Mountains
Mountains dominate the topography of Rabun County.
*For more information, see: List of Summits and Ridges in Rabun County, Georgia

Waterfalls
Rabun County has a number of picturesque waterfalls, many of which are easily reached by relatively short trails. Among the favorites of visitors to the county are Dick's Creek Falls, Holcomb Creek Falls and Minnehaha Falls.

Hiking trails
The county has numerous hiking trails. Most notably, a portion of the Appalachian Trail winds through the county and the county is home to a  portion of the Bartram Trail.

Major highways

  U.S. Route 23
  U.S. Route 76
  U.S. Route 441
  State Route 2
  State Route 15
  State Route 28
  State Route 197
  State Route 246

US 23 and US 441 run concurrent, following a south–north route through the county, and US 76 runs west–east. SR 246 begins at Dillard and connects to Sky Valley. SR 28 runs for an extremely short distance in the northeastern tip, between the Carolinas.

Adjacent counties
 Macon County, North Carolina - north
 Oconee County, South Carolina - east
 Habersham County - south
 Towns County - west
 Clay County, North Carolina - northwest

Flora and fauna

Rabun County is home to several endangered and threatened species as reported by the US Fish & Wildlife Service and the Georgia Department of Natural Resources.

Animals
 The bald eagle (Haliaeetus leucocephalus) has been removed from the list of endangered species in the US, but is considered to be an endangered species in Georgia.
 The bog turtle (Clemmys muhlenbergii) is considered to be a threatened species in both the US and Georgia.
 Three fish found in the county still have their status pending on the US endangered species list, but are protected in Georgia: the fatlips minnow (endangered in Georgia), the highscale shiner (threatened in Georgia) and the olive darter (threatened in Georgia).

Plants
There are 15 plants that are protected in Rabun County, including two that are on the Federal endangered species list: persistent trillium (Trillium persistens), rock gnome lichen (Gymnoderma lineare) and swamp pink (Helonias bullata).

Demographics

2000 census
As of the census of 2000, there were 15,050 people, 6,279 households, and 4,351 families residing in the county. The population density was 41 people per square mile (16/km2). There were 10,210 housing units at an average density of 28 per square mile (11/km2). The racial makeup of the county was 94.88% White, 0.79% Black or African American, 0.43% Native American, 0.38% Asian, 0.03% Pacific Islander, 2.63% from other races, and 0.86% from two or more races. 4.54% of the population were Hispanic or Latino of any race.

There were 6,279 households, out of which 26.50% had children under the age of 18 living with them, 57.40% were married couples living together, 8.10% had a female householder with no husband present, and 30.70% were non-families. 26.80% of all households were made up of individuals, and 11.70% had someone living alone who was 65 years of age or older. The average household size was 2.35 and the average family size was 2.82.

In the county, the population was spread out, with 21.80% under the age of 18, 7.00% from 18 to 24, 25.30% from 25 to 44, 27.70% from 45 to 64, and 18.10% who were 65 years of age or older. The median age was 42 years. For every 100 females there were 97.40 males. For every 100 females age 18 and over, there were 94.50 males.

The median income for a household in the county was $33,899, and the median income for a family was $39,992. Males had a median income of $28,105 versus $21,164 for females. The per capita income for the county was $20,608. About 8.10% of families and 11.10% of the population were below the poverty line, including 11.00% of those under age 18 and 13.00% of those age 65 or over.

2010 census
As of the 2010 United States Census, there were 16,276 people, 6,780 households, and 4,528 families residing in the county. The racial makeup of the county was 93.3% white, 1.0% black or African American, 0.7% Asian, 0.4% American Indian, 3.0% from other races, and 1.5% from two or more races. Those of Hispanic or Latino origin made up 8.0% of the population. In terms of ancestry, 16.5% were English, 12.8% were Irish, 11.8% were German, 10.1% were American, and 5.3% were Scotch-Irish.

Of the 6,780 households, 26.6% had children under the age of 18 living with them, 52.4% were married couples living together, 9.6% had a female householder with no husband present, 33.2% were non-families, and 28.5% of all households were made up of individuals. The average household size was 2.34 and the average family size was 2.85. The median age was 45.8 years.

The median income for a household in the county was $34,406 and the median income for a family was $50,410. Males had a median income of $35,951 versus $23,025 for females. The per capita income for the county was $22,471. About 12.7% of families and 18.5% of the population were below the poverty line, including 21.6% of those under age 18 and 11.5% of those age 65 or over.

2020 census

As of the 2020 United States census, there were 16,883 people, 6,662 households, and 4,220 families residing in the county.

Economy
As of early 2006, the county's two largest employers are textile manufacturers: Rabun Apparel, with over 900 jobs, and National Textiles, with 410. In March 2006, Fruit of the Loom announced it would close the Rabun Apparel plant and lay off all 930 employees. National Textiles has also announced layoffs, but so far, those have only targeted plants in North Carolina and Tennessee.

Education 

The Rabun County School District holds pre-school to grade twelve, and consists of a primary school, an elementary school, a middle school, and a high school. The district has 140 full-time teachers and over 2,221 students.
 Rabun County Primary School
 Rabun County Elementary School
 Rabun County Middle School
 Rabun County High School

Rabun Gap-Nacoochee School, a private residential and day school, also operates in the county. It serves boarding students in grades 6–12 and day students pre-K–12.

Communities

Cities
 Clayton
 Dillard
 Mountain City
 Sky Valley
 Tallulah Falls
 Tiger

Unincorporated communities
 Wiley
 Lakemont
 Persimmon
 Pine Mountain
 Rabun Gap

In popular culture
 In 2012, producer Cory Welles and director Kevin Walker decided to make the documentary, The Deliverance of Rabun County, to explore the effects of the landmark 1972 film on people in the county. They heard a wide range of opinions, particularly resentment at how the country people were portrayed. Others are pragmatic and looking at the benefits of increased tourism and related businesses.
 Rabun was the primary shooting location for the 1972 film Deliverance and used many locals as extras, including Billy Redden.  While the setting for the movie is suggested as in the north Georgia mountains, Rabun is not specifically mentioned in the film.
 Larry Burkett's 1991 fantasy novel The Illuminati (1991) is set partly in Rabun County. It and the county seat of Clayton become the refuge of the book's protagonists after forces take control over the American economy; Clayton is safe due to the antiquated analog communications gear and general isolation underlying stereotypes of the area.
 Rabun County is one of the battlegrounds where humans fight the alien Posleen invaders in John Ringo's Legacy of the Aldenata series of science fiction books.
 Rabun County is the setting for the play Foxfire, which had its Broadway premiere in 1982 starring Jessica Tandy and her husband Hume Cronyn.  The play was later made into a Hallmark TV movie, starring Tandy, Cronyn, and John Denver.  In both the play and the movie, there are several references to Rabun County and the surrounding area.
 Rabun County is the home of the magazine Foxfire.  In 1966, Eliot Wigginton and his students in an English class at Rabun Gap-Nacoochee School initiated a project to engage students in writing. The class decided to publish a magazine over the course of the semester. Its articles were the product of the students' interviewing their relatives and local citizens about how lifestyles had changed over the course of their lives and dealt with traditions in the rural area. First published in 1966, the magazine covers topics of the lifestyle, culture, crafts, and skills of people in southern Appalachia.

See also

 National Register of Historic Places listings in Rabun County, Georgia
List of counties in Georgia

References

External links

Archives of Rabun County on Roadside Georgia 
Georgia Place Names by Kenneth K. Krakow
Cherokee Indian Tribe on Access Genealogy – Indian Tribal RecordsArchived
History of Chattahoohee National Forest 
Rabun County Sheriff's Office

 
1819 establishments in Georgia (U.S. state)
Counties of Appalachia
Georgia (U.S. state) counties
Northeast Georgia
Populated places established in 1819